John Falk "Bob" Poser (March 16, 1910 – May 21, 2002) was a pitcher in Major League Baseball. He played for the Chicago White Sox and St. Louis Browns.  Although Poser was listed as a pitcher, he was a good hitting outfielder in the minor leagues, and was used more as a pinch hitter than as a pitcher by the White Sox.

References

External links

1910 births
2002 deaths
Major League Baseball pitchers
Chicago White Sox players
St. Louis Browns players
Baseball players from Wisconsin
People from Columbus, Wisconsin
Wisconsin Badgers baseball players
Des Moines Demons players
Minneapolis Millers (baseball) players
Toronto Maple Leafs (International League) players
American expatriate baseball players in Canada
American physicians
Wisconsin Badgers men's basketball players
University of Wisconsin School of Medicine and Public Health alumni